Nina Ellen Ødegård (born 2 November 1979 in Stavanger) is a Norwegian actress. She made her stage debut at Rogaland Teater in 2002 in a play by Brian Friel. Among her films are Play from 2003 and Alt for Egil from 2004. Her role as "Josie" in O'Neill's play Måne for livets stebarn in 2005 earned her the Hedda Award for best stage performance.

References

1979 births
Living people
Actors from Stavanger
Norwegian stage actresses
Norwegian film actresses